Dhallewali is a village of Sialkot District  in the Punjab province of Pakistan. It is located at 32°38'60N 74°28'60E and has an altitude of 235m (774ft).

References

Villages in Sialkot District